William John Pinkerton was a Scottish amateur football goalkeeper who appeared in the Scottish League for Queen's Park.

References

Scottish footballers
Scottish Football League players
Queen's Park F.C. players
Association football goalkeepers
1932 births
Footballers from Glasgow
Living people
Scotland amateur international footballers